The DAF CF is a range of trucks produced since 1992 by the Dutch truck manufacturer DAF Trucks NV. Originally launched as the 65, 75, and 85 series (from 1992 through 1997), they were renamed the CF range in 1998. Most left-hand drive DAF trucks are assembled in Eindhoven, while all right-hand drive units for the UK market are produced by Leyland Trucks.

Gallery

Notes

CF
CF
Vehicles introduced in 1992
Cab over vehicles